The Perfume of the Lady in Black (French: Le Parfum de la dame en noir) is a 1949 French mystery film directed by Louis Daquin and starring Hélène Perdrière, Serge Reggiani and Marcel Herrand. It is an adaptation of the 1908 novel The Perfume of the Lady in Black by Gaston Leroux featuring the detective Joseph Rouletabille. It is a sequel to The Mystery of the Yellow Room, released the same year.

The film's sets were designed by the art director Max Douy. The score was composed by Jean Wiener.

Main cast
 Hélène Perdrière as Mathilde Stangerson
 Serge Reggiani as Joseph Rouletabille
 Lucien Nat as Robert Darzac
 Michel Piccoli as Lebel
 Gaston Modot as Mathieu
 Marcel Herrand as Larsan
 Arthur Devère as Père Jacques
 Yvette Etiévant as Une fille à la soirée chez Rouletabille

References

Bibliography
 Parish, Robert. Film Actors Guide. Scarecrow Press, 1977.

External links

1949 films
1940s French-language films
Films based on French novels
Films based on works by Gaston Leroux
Films directed by Louis Daquin
Remakes of French films
French black-and-white films
French sequel films
1949 mystery films
French mystery films
1940s French films